Joseph Jefferson "Jeff" Carlin (June 5, 1905 – April 14, 1957) was an American football, basketball, and baseball player and coach.

Carlin attended high school at Lawrence High School in Cedarhurst, New York, where he was a star baseball, basketball, and football athlete.  Collegiately, he played baseball, basketball, and football at Washington & Jefferson College, playing in the 1922 Rose Bowl.  He declined an offer from the New York Giants professional baseball team to coach college basketball.

Carlin was a long time basketball coach at Case Tech in Cleveland, Ohio from 1930 to 1946.  He was also a head college coach football for four games in 1945.

From 1944 to 1946, he was the head basketball coach of the NBL's Cleveland Allmen Transfers and star player Mel Riebe.

Head coaching record

Football

References

External links
 
 Pro Basketball Encyclopedia - Jeff Carlin 
sports-reference college stats 
eurobasket.com player profile 

1905 births
1957 deaths
American men's basketball players
Case Western Spartans football coaches
Case Western Spartans men's basketball coaches
Washington & Jefferson Presidents baseball players
Washington & Jefferson Presidents football players
Washington & Jefferson Presidents men's basketball players
Lawrence High School (Cedarhurst, New York) alumni
People from Lawrence, Nassau County, New York
Sportspeople from Nassau County, New York
Coaches of American football from New York (state)
Players of American football from New York (state)
Baseball players from New York (state)
Basketball players from New York (state)